Acremodontina simplex is a species of sea snail, a marine gastropod mollusk in the family Trochaclididae, the false top snails.

References

External links
 To World Register of Marine Species

simplex
Gastropods described in 1937